Automatic mutual exclusion is a parallel computing programming paradigm in which threads are divided into atomic chunks, and the atomic execution of the chunks automatically parallelized using transactional memory.

References

See also 
 Bulk synchronous parallel

Parallel computing
Programming paradigms